All Night may refer to:

Film and broadcasting
All Night (film), a 1918 silent comedy film starring Carmel Myers and Rudolph Valentino
All Night (TV series), a 2018 American comedy web television series
 All Night Nippon or simply All Night, a Japanese late-night radio talk show
 AllNight with Todd Wright, a sports radio talk show, 1996-2005
 AllNight with Jason Smith, its successor show, 2005-2011

Music
 "All Night" (Steve Aoki and Lauren Jauregui song), 2017
 "All Night" (Beyoncé song), 2016
 "All Night" (Big Boi song), 2017
 "All Night" (Brothers Osborne song), 2020
 "All Night" (BTS and Juice Wrld song), 2019
 "All Night" (Example song), 2018
 "All Night" (Girls' Generation song), 2017
 "All Night" (Icona Pop song), 2013
 "All Night" (Juicy J and Wiz Khalifa song), 2016
 "All Night" (Lynsey de Paul song), 1973
 "All Night" (R5 song), 2015
 "All Night" (Trinere song), 1985
 "All Night" (The Vamps and Matoma song), 2016
 "All Night", a song by Apathy featuring Tak & Celph Titled from Fort Minor: We Major
 "All Night", a song by Brotherhood of Man from Images
 "All Night", a song by Chance the Rapper from Coloring Book
 "All Night", a song by Def Leppard from Euphoria
 "All Night", a song by Damien Marley from Welcome to Jamrock
 "All Night", a song by Parov Stelar from The Princess
 "All Night", a song by Pearl Jam from Lost Dogs

See also 
 All Night Long (disambiguation)
 Open All Night (disambiguation)
 Up All Night (disambiguation)